Calyptraea, commonly known as the Chinese hat snails is a genus of sea snails, marine gastropod mollusks in the family Calyptraeidae, a family which contains the slipper snails or slipper limpets, cup-and-saucer snails, and Chinese hat snails.

Species
Species within the genus Calyptraea include:

 Calyptraea africana Rolán, 2004
 † Calyptraea alta (Conrad, 1854)
 Calyptraea aurita Reeve, 1859
 Calyptraea barnardi Kilburn, 1980
 Calyptraea burchi Smith & Gordon, 1948
 Calyptraea capensis Tomlin, 1931
 Calyptraea centralis (Conrad, 1841)
 Calyptraea chinensis (Linnaeus, 1758)
 Calyptraea conica Broderip, 1834
 Calyptraea contorta (Carpenter, 1864)
 Calyptraea edgariana Melvill, 1898
 Calyptraea fastigiata Gould, 1846
 Calyptraea helicoidea (G. B. Sowerby II, 1883)
 Calyptraea inexpectata Rolán, 2004
 Calyptraea lichen Broderip, 1834
 Calyptraea mamillaris Broderip, 1834
 Calyptraea pellucida (Reeve, 1859)
 † Calyptraea primogenita Kiel, 2003 (taxon inquirendum) 
 Calyptraea renovata (Crosse & P. Fischer, 1890)
 Calyptraea sakaguchii Kuroda & Habe, 1961
 Calyptraea spinifera (Gray, 1867)
 Calyptraea spirala (Forbes, 1852)
 Calyptraea subreflexa (Carpenter, 1856)
 † Calyptraea trochiformis Lamarck, 1804
 Calyptraea ventricosa (Carpenter, 1857)
 Calyptraea yokoyamai Kuroda, 1929
Species brought into synonymy
 Calyptraea aberrans C.B. Adams, 1852: synonym of Anomia peruviana d'Orbigny, 1846
 Calyptraea adolphei Lesson, 1831: synonym of Crepipatella dilatata (Lamarck, 1822)
 Calyptraea amygdalus Valenciennes, 1846: synonym of Crepidula onyx G.B. Sowerby I, 1824
 Calyptraea arenata Broderip, 1834: synonym of Crepidula excavata (Broderip, 1834)
 Calyptraea dormitoria Reeve, 1858: synonym of Cheilea dormitoria (Reeve, 1858)
 Calyptraea dorsata Broderip, 1834: synonym of Crepidula dorsata (Broderip, 1834)
 Calyptraea echinus Broderip, 1834: synonym of Crepidula aculeata (Gmelin, 1791)
 Calyptraea excavata Broderip, 1834: synonym of Crepidula excavata (Broderip, 1834)
 Calyptraea hystrix Broderip, 1834: synonym of Crepidula aculeata (Gmelin, 1791)
 Calyptraea incurva Broderip, 1834: synonym of Crepidula incurva (Broderip, 1834)
 Calyptraea lessonii Broderip, 1834: synonym of Crepidula lessonii (Broderip, 1834)
 Calyptraea marginalis Broderip, 1834: synonym of Crepidula marginalis (Broderip, 1834)
 Calyptraea monoxyla Lesson, 1831: synonym of Maoricrypta monoxyla (Lesson, 1831)
 Calyptraea plana A. Adams & Reeve, 1850: synonym of Crepidula walshi (Reeve, 1859)
 Calyptraea rugosa Carpenter, 1856: synonym of Crepidula onyx G.B. Sowerby I, 1824
 Calyptraea sinensis (Linnaeus, 1758): synonym of Calyptraea chinensis (Linnaeus, 1758)
 Calyptraea spinosa G. B. Sowerby I, 1824: synonym of Crucibulum spinosum (G. B. Sowerby I, 1824)
 Calyptraea squama Broderip, 1834: synonym of Crepidula striolata Menke, 1851
 Calyptraea strigata Broderip, 1834: synonym of Crepidula dilatata (Lamarck, 1822)

References

 Bernard, P.A. (Ed.) (1984). Coquillages du Gabon [Shells of Gabon]. Pierre A. Bernard: Libreville, Gabon. 140, 75 plates 
 Vaught, K.C. (1989). A classification of the living Mollusca. American Malacologists: Melbourne, FL (USA). . XII, 195 pp.
 Gofas, S.; Le Renard, J.; Bouchet, P. (2001). Mollusca, in: Costello, M.J. et al. (Ed.) (2001). European register of marine species: a check-list of the marine species in Europe and a bibliography of guides to their identification. Collection Patrimoines Naturels, 50: pp. 180–213

External links
 Lamarck, J.B.M. (1799). Prodrome d'une nouvelle classification des coquilles, comprenant une rédaction appropriée des caractères géneriques, et l'établissement d'un grand nombre de genres nouveaux. Mémoires de la Société d'Histoire Naturelle de Paris. 1: 63-91
 Eames, F. E. 1957. Eocene Mollusca from Nigeria: a revision. Bulletin of the British Museum (Natural History) Geology 3:23–70, pls. 5–10.

Calyptraeidae